Empire Bay may refer to:

, a collier built in 1940 and sunk by bombing on 15 January 1942
Empire Bay, New South Wales
A fictional city in the 2010 video game Mafia II